Phyllis Ann George (June 25, 1949 – May 14, 2020) was an American businesswoman, actress, and sportscaster. In 1975, George was hired as a reporter and co-host of the CBS Sports pre-show The NFL Today, becoming one of the first women to hold an on-air position in national televised sports broadcasting. She also served as the First Lady of Kentucky from 1979 to 1983.

She won Miss Texas in 1970 and was crowned Miss America 1971.

Early life
George was born to Diantha Louise George (née Cogdell) (1919-2003) and James Robert George (1918-1996) in Denton, Texas. She attended North Texas State University (now University of North Texas) for three years until she was crowned Miss Texas in 1970. At that time, Texas Christian University awarded scholarships to Miss Texas honorees. As a result, George left North Texas and enrolled at TCU until winning the Miss America crown later that fall. She was a member of the Zeta Tau Alpha sorority.

Pageantry
George first competed for Miss Texas as Miss Denton in 1969 finishing fourth. The next year she competed as Miss Dallas and was named Miss Texas 1970, then was crowned Miss America 1971 on September 12, 1970. The Women's Liberation Front demonstrated at the event.

In August 1971, George traveled to Vietnam with Miss Iowa Cheryl Browne; Miss Nevada 1970 Vicky Jo Todd; Miss New Jersey 1970 Hela Yungst; Miss Arizona 1970 Karen Shields; Miss Arkansas 1970 Donna Connelly; and George's replacement after she was crowned Miss America Miss Texas 1970 Belinda Myrick. They participated in a 22-day United Service Organizations tour for American troops there.

During her year-long stint as Miss America, George appeared on numerous talk shows, including three interviews on The Tonight Show Starring Johnny Carson.

Career
George's television career began as a host on the comedy show Candid Camera.

CBS Sports
CBS Sports producers approached George to become a sportscaster in 1974. The following year, she joined the cast of The NFL Today, co-hosting live pregame shows before National Football League  games. She was one of the first women to have a nationally prominent role in television sports coverage. As a former beauty queen with a limited television background, she was criticized for not possessing the traditional qualifications for a sportscaster. After three seasons on The NFL Today, she was replaced by another beauty queen, Jayne Kennedy. George returned to the show in 1980 and remained until 1984. She became known for her interviews with athletes. Hannah Storm, an anchor at ESPN's SportsCenter, called George "a true trailblazer" for being an inspirational role model for women who wanted to pursue careers in sportscasting.

Another duty George had with CBS Sports was working on horse racing events, including the Preakness Stakes and the Belmont Stakes. Additionally, George had a brief stint on a television news version of People magazine in 1978 and a job as a morning television talk show host as co-anchor of the CBS Morning News in 1985. She also hosted her own prime-time talk show, 1994's A Phyllis George Special, on which she interviewed then-President Bill Clinton, and a 1998 talk show titled Women's Day on the cable network PAX. George also appeared as a guest on The Muppet Show in 1979.

CBS Morning News

In 1985, CBS settled on Phyllis George to serve as a permanent anchor for its morning news program. George was given a three-year contract following a two-week trial run. As co-anchor, she interviewed newsmakers including then–First Lady Nancy Reagan.

A low point of her eight-month stint on The CBS Morning News happened when George embarrassed herself during a May 1985 interview with Gary Dotson and Cathleen Webb. Dotson just had been freed after six years in prison on a rape charge by Webb. Webb ended up recanting her story so Dotson was set free. Both appeared on the CBS program as part of (as George later told Tom Shales of The Washington Post) a Webb-Dotson press tour "charade." Both were on or had appeared on NBC News and ABC News as well as other media outlets. As the segment began to wrap, George first suggested the two shake hands. After a brief hesitation from them and no hand shake, George then proposed they "hug it out." A brief moment of awkwardness followed but no hug. The invitation to embrace was deemed highly inappropriate prompting a few phone calls from irate CBS viewers. George also was criticized in the press.

According to news reports at the time, George had been brought in to boost the ratings of the perennial third place ranked program. CBS News staffers were mystified as to why someone with little to no journalism experience was picked over a more qualified candidate from the CBS News roster of reporters and anchors. George had been a talent for the sports division, but had not worked in news. However, this experiment failed to work out, and George was ousted just a few months later. Maria Shriver, then a CBS News employee, took her place as part of another revamp of the program.

Business interests

George founded two companies in the course of her business career, the first of which was "Chicken by George" chicken fillets. In 1988 after operating for only two years, George sold the company to Hormel Foods, which agreed to operate it as a separate division. In 1991, George received the "Celebrity Women Business Owner of the Year" from the National Association of Women Business Owners.

In 2003, she created Phyllis George Beauty, which markets a line of cosmetics and skincare products through television shopping network HSN.

She also wrote or co-authored five books—three about crafts, one on dieting (her first book, The I Love America Diet, published in 1982), and the final one published during her lifetime, Never Say Never (2002).

George was the founder of the Kentucky Museum of Art and Craft, and was an avid folk and traditional arts collector. She was also a founding member of the Henry Clay Center for Statesmanship.

George resurfaced in 2000 when she played a minor character in the hit movie Meet the Parents. It was one of her very few film roles.

Personal life

George was married twice. Her first marriage was to Hollywood producer Robert Evans, and her second to Kentucky Fried Chicken owner and governor of Kentucky John Y. Brown Jr. George served as Kentucky's First Lady during Brown's term in office. During her marriage to Brown, she had two children, Lincoln Tyler George Brown and Pamela Ashley Brown.  Both of George's marriages ended in divorce.

George died of complications from polycythemia vera, a blood cancer, on May 14, 2020, aged 70, at the Albert B. Chandler Hospital in Lexington, Kentucky.

References

External links
Profile of Phyllis George on the Miss America website (accessed March 7, 2008)
One to One with Bill Goodman: Phyllis George - interview with Phyllis George on Kentucky Educational Television network, June 8, 2008

1949 births
2020 deaths
American beauty pageant winners
American color commentators
American food industry businesspeople
American horse racing announcers
American television sports announcers
American women in business
Beauty pageant hosts
Deaths from cancer in Kentucky
Deaths from blood cancer
Figure skating commentators
First Ladies and Gentlemen of Kentucky
Miss America 1971 delegates
Miss America Preliminary Swimsuit winners
Miss America winners
National Football League announcers
People from Denton, Texas
People from Lexington, Kentucky
Sports Emmy Award winners
Tennis commentators
Texas Christian University alumni
University of North Texas alumni
Women sports announcers
Writers from Kentucky
Writers from Texas
Evans family (Paramount Pictures)
21st-century American women